The 17th Aerobic Gymnastics World Championships took place in  Guimarães, Portugal from June 16 to 18, 2022.

Event

Medal table

References

External links
FIG site
Results Book

2022 in gymnastics
Aerobic Gymnastics World Championships
Sport in Guimarães
International gymnastics competitions hosted by Portugal
Aerobic Gymnastics World Championships
Aerobic Gymnastics World Championships